Kalika is a village development committee in Bardiya District in Lumbini Province of south-western Nepal. At the time of the 1991 Nepal census, it had a population of 7,547 and had 1,305 houses in the town.

References

Populated places in Bardiya District